Bible Grove is an unincorporated community in Clay County, Illinois, United States. Bible Grove once had a post office, which closed on October 22, 1988.

MLB pitcher George Lyons was born in Bible Grove in 1891.

See also
Bible Grove, Missouri

References

Unincorporated communities in Clay County, Illinois
Unincorporated communities in Illinois